The Charles Piper Building is a building in southeast Portland, Oregon listed on the National Register of Historic Places.

Further reading

See also
 National Register of Historic Places listings in Southeast Portland, Oregon

References

External links
 

1929 establishments in Oregon
Buildings and structures completed in 1929
Commercial buildings on the National Register of Historic Places in Oregon
National Register of Historic Places in Portland, Oregon
Portland Eastside MPS
Portland Historic Landmarks
Richmond, Portland, Oregon
Spanish Revival architecture in the United States